Abdul Menaem Al Ameri, also known as  Abdul Menaem Al Ameri, is an Emirati singer.

Early life
Al-Ameri was a football player but he was forced out from fields due to an injury after spending nine years with Al Ain Club.

Discography

Albums
 She Wanted Fancy (1998)
 Transparent (2000)
 El Asl (2003)
 Close to You Darling (2004) 
 Amiri (2006)
 The Legend (2009)

References

Emirati male singers
Living people
People from the Emirate of Sharjah
People from Khor Fakkan
Emirati composers
1969 births